Expeditie Robinson 2020 is the twenty-first season of the Dutch version of the Swedish television series Expedition Robinson as well as the second season of the Belgian version of the show. This season is the first time since 2012 where Belgian and Dutch contestants competed side-by-side as well as the first time since 2009 in which they're all anonymous castaways.

The main twist this season is that the tribes are divided by nationality. However, after a challenge on day one, the contestant that finished last from both countries were sent to be members of the other tribe. Another twist this season is Revenge Island. After a contestant is voted out, they compete in a duel with the next eliminated contestant until one renters the game. The loser of the duel is sent home, eliminated from the game.

Finishing order

References

External links

Expeditie Robinson seasons
2020 in Belgian television
2020 Dutch television seasons